Comesperma is a genus of shrubs,  herbs and lianas in the family Polygalaceae. The genus is endemic to Australia. It was defined by the French botanist Jacques Labillardière in his 1806 work Novae Hollandiae Plantarum Specimen. The genus name is derived from the Ancient Greek words come ("hair") and sperma ("seed"), and relates to the seeds bearing tufts of hair. The genus is distributed over southern Australia, particularly in the southwest of Western Australia, where 19 species are found. 24 species have been described.

The genus was classified in the tribe Polygaleae by Swiss botanist Robert Hippolyte Chodat in 1896. It was also considered a section of the genus Bredemeyera by van Steenis in 1968. This was not adopted widely, and a cladistic study based on morphology published in 1993 suggested they remain as separate genera. This analysis placed Comersperma basal to a group comprising the genera Polygala, Monnina subg. Monninopsis, Nylandtia, Muralita and Epirixanthes.

They are generally small shrubs, climbers or trailing plants, with small to vestigial leaves arranged alternately on the stem. The flowers resemble those of pea-flowers, and are borne in racemes. They are generally pink through shades of purple to blue in colour, although yellow-flowered species are known. Although the flowers are smaller than those of the related genus Polygala, the racemes can be showy, especially of floriferous species such as Comesperma ericinum.

Comesperma ericinum and  C. volubile are sometimes seen in cultivation.

Species
 Comesperma acerosum Steetz  
 Comesperma aphyllum Benth. 
 Comesperma breviflorum Pedley
 Comesperma calcicola Keighery 
 Comesperma calymega Labill. - blue-spike milkwort 
 Comesperma ciliatum Steetz
 Comesperma confertum Labill.  
 Comesperma defoliatum F.Muell.  
 Comesperma drummondii Steetz - Drummond's milkwort
 Comesperma ericinum DC. - pyramid flower, heath milkwort
 Comesperma esulifolium (Gand.) Prain   
 Comesperma flavum DC. 
 Comesperma griffinii Keighery 
 Comesperma hispidulum Pedley
 Comesperma integerrimum Endl.
 Comesperma lanceolatum Benth.
 Comesperma nudiusculum DC.
 Comesperma oblongatum (Benth.)
 Comesperma pallidum Pedley 
 Comesperma patentifolium F.Muell.  
 Comesperma polygaloides F.Muell. - small milkwort 
 Comesperma praecelsum F.Muell.
 Comesperma retusum Labill.  
 Comesperma rhadinocarpum F.Muell. - slender-fruited comesperma
 Comesperma scoparium J.Drumm. - broom milkwort
 Comesperma secundum DC. 
 Comesperma sphaerocarpum Steetz 
 Comesperma spinosum F.Muell. - spiny milkwort 
 Comesperma sylvestre Lindl. 
 Comesperma virgatum Labill. - milkwort 
 Comesperma viscidulum F.Muell.
 Comesperma volubile Labill. - love creeper 
 Comesperma xanthocarpum Steud.

References

External links
 

 
Fabales genera
Taxa named by Jacques Labillardière
Plants described in 1806